Alice Williams may refer to:

People
Alice Williams (welfare) (1863–1957), British welfare worker
Alice Meredith Williams (1877–1934), British sculptor, painter, illustrator and stained glass designer
Alice Williams or Buda Godman (1888–1945), American criminal, actress, and singer
Alice Matilda Langland Williams, Welsh political writer and celtophile

Fictional characters
Alice Williams, a character in The Bounty Hunter
Alice Williams, a character in Detroit 1-8-7

See also
Alice Williams Brotherton (1848–1930), American author
Beryl Alice Williams, Australian politician
Mary Alice Williams (born 1949), news anchor
Matilda Alice Williams (1875–1973), deaconess
Alys Williams (disambiguation)
Alice Williamson (disambiguation)